Carlos Gustavo Galindo De La Rosa  (born 7 April 2000) is a Mexican professional footballer who plays as a goalkeeper.

Career

Youth career
Galindo first joined Club Atlas youth academy in 2015. He then transferred to third division team Mulos del Club Deportivo Oro successfully capping 29 games. Galindo then continues his development with Tigres UANL Reserves and Academy going through the U-17 and U-20. After unusual circumstances receiving an opportunity to play with Liga MX first team Tigres UANL under Brazilian coach Tuca Ferretti.

After previously playing in the Atlas youth system and appearing in six games with the Tigres under-20 squad in 2019–20, he was later released during that season. Due to the circumstances Galindo considered giving up his dream of becoming a professional player. However, he was signed on a two-year deal as an emergency replacement on August 14, 2020, after both first-team keepers tested positive for COVID-19 and both under-20 keepers were injured. He made his Liga MX debut two days later, receiving three goals in a 3–2 loss against Toluca.

Career statistics

Club

Honours

Club
Tigres UANL
CONCACAF Champions League: 2020

References

External links
 
 

2000 births
Living people
Mexican footballers
Association football goalkeepers
Tigres UANL footballers
Cimarrones de Sonora players
Chihuahua F.C. footballers
Liga MX players
Liga de Expansión MX players
Tercera División de México players
Footballers from Guadalajara, Jalisco